Bearfort Mountain, historically known as Bear Ford Mountain, is a mountain ridge located near Wawayanda State Park in West Milford, Passaic County, New Jersey. It is a continuation of Bellvale Mountain in New York. The Appalachian Trail crosses along the ridge into New York. Puddingstone of the Skunnemunk Conglomerate is visible along the ridge.

The mountain was depicted in an 1850 painting by Jasper Francis Cropsey, an American landscape artist of the Hudson River School.

See also
 List of New Jersey Forest Fire Service fire towers

References

Ridges of New Jersey
Landforms of Passaic County, New Jersey
Mountains on the Appalachian Trail